Düren (ripuarian: Düre) is a town in North Rhine-Westphalia, Germany, between Aachen and Cologne on the river Rur.

History

Roman era
The area of Düren was part of Gallia Belgica, more specifically the territory of the Eburones, a people who were described as both Belgae and Germani.
It was conquered by the Roman Republic  under Julius Caesar and became part of Germania inferior.

Durum became a supply area for the rapidly growing Roman city of Cologne (Roman name Colonia Claudia Ara Agrippinensium). Furthermore, a few important Roman roads skirt Durum (including the road from Cologne to Jülich and Tongeren and the road from Cologne to Zülpich and Trier). By the 4th century, the area was settled by the Ripuarian Franks.
The name villa duria occurred the first time in the Frankish Annals in the year 747.

Frankish king  Pippin the Short often visited Düren in the 8th century and held a few important conventions there. The Franks made of Durum a royal palace, from which the name Palatine (Pfalz in German) is derived. Charlemagne sojourned a few times there.  Due to the frequent visits of Charlemagne, a few markets sprang up, such as the corn, cattle, wood, chicken, and butter markets, all of which contributed to Düren's development. The castle was built at the place where, since 1991, the Saint Anne Church is located.

Middle Ages
Düren obtained city rights in the early 13th century. Around 1200, the construction of the city wall was started, which includes 12 towers and 5 gates. The gates faced all directions: in the north, the Philippstor) and the Wirteltor, in the east the Kölntor (Cologne gate), in the south the Obertor and in the west the Holztor (wooden gate). There are still ruins of the gates today.

The chiseler Leonhard stole a small box with the relic of Saint Anne out of the Mainzer Stiftskirche St. Stephan in 1501 and brought it to Düren. Pope Julius II decided on March 18, 1506 that Düren could keep the remains. They were kept in the Martinskirche (church of Saint Martin) which was renamed the Annakirche (church of Saint Anne) in 1505. (Probably the church was renamed much later, because in the 19th century it was still called sometimes parish church of the holy Martinus). Saint Anne became the patron saint of Düren. Every year, the saint's day of Saint Anne (July 26) is celebrated for one week with the Anna octavos and the Anna parish fair, one of the biggest folk festivals of Germany.

17th to 19th century

In 1642, Düren was embroiled in the Thirty Years' War. Opposing troops destroyed the city. After the war has finally ended in 1648, plague broke out and caused many lives to be lost. A second plague epidemic broke out in 1665. Due to the various attacks on the debilitated city, Düren was destroyed again in 1679. In this time, the settlement Miesheim was destroyed, never to be rebuilt.

Towards the end of the year 1755 in the area around Düren and Aachen began a series of earthquakes, which reached its peak on February 18, 1756 with an earthquake with the strength 8 on the Mercalli scale. The series of earthquakes affected all of Europe, most famously the 1755 Lisbon earthquake.

The businesses in the area of Düren was affected since the 15th century by the drapery and metal industry. Since the beginning of the 17th century, paper industry had settled here, advantaged by the exceptionally soft water of the Rur. Rütger von Scheven built the first paper mill in Düren. In 1812, there were already 17 paper factories, 11 cloth- and blanket factories, an iron rolling mill or slitting mill and two iron foundries.

In the year 1794, Düren was occupied by French revolutionary troops. From 1798 until 1814, Düren was the main city of the same named canton in the arrondissement Aachen of the French Roerdepartements (from the name of the River Rur (Roer) and départment). After the Congress of Vienna in 1815, Düren was ceded to the Kingdom of Prussia and was subsequently administered within the Rhine Province.

20th century
By 1900, Düren was among Germany's richest cities (with 42 millionaires and 93 factories) and had a population of 27,168. By comparison, fewer than 5,000 people had lived in Düren a century earlier.

The city of Düren was located on the main fighting front during the Allied invasion of Germany in World War II.  During 1944 and 1945, the protracted and bloody Battle for Hürtgenwald was fought on Düren's district area, and on November 16, 1944, Düren was completely destroyed by Allied air bombings. Approximately 22,000 people lived in Düren at that time, and 3,000 of them died during the bombing.  Those who survived were evacuated to central Germany. Destroyed buildings included the Stadttheater Düren (1907), designed in Jugendstil by Carl Moritz.

By 1939, the population had risen to over 45,000, but then fell to just 3,806 by June 1945 due to the effects of World War II. After the bombing of November 16, 1944, on March 1, 1945, only four German residents lived in the city, including forced laborers etc. there were 21 people. On April 1st, the number of inhabitants had risen to 180 and on May 1st, 1945 there were already 1218 people. In December 1945 the number increased to 25,000 inhabitants and in 1958 it was 45,000, the same number as before the war. Due to the incorporation of several places in the area, the city's population grew on January 1, 1972 by 35,522 to 89,087.

On February 25, 1945, U.S. troops crossed the Rur at Düren. After the war was over in the summer that year, many evacuated people came back to the destroyed city and started to rebuild their homes against the advice of the American troops. By June 1945, the population had risen to 3,806. Most of the architecture in Düren therefore dates from the 1950s.

Culture and points of interest
The most famous museum of Düren is the Leopold Hoesch Museum. The in 1905 in Baroque Revival architecture erected building presents changing exhibitions of contemporary art. Since 1986, can also be seen artworks of the international Biennale PaperArt. Since 2006, is in the former nurses' home of the St. Augustinus Hospital Lendersdorf the Düren Carnival Museum. The most recent museum is the in 2009 founded Stadtmuseum Düren. This museum shows an exhibition of the local history.

Theatre and music
The former Stadttheater Düren was opened in January 1907. In the bombing of November 16, 1944 the theatre was almost completely destroyed. Today cultural performances take  place mainly at the Haus der Stadt. Since 2004 the multi-functional Arena Kreis Düren, which has around 2000 seats, serves as a venue for major concerts.

Buildings
At the edge of the forest in the Niederau district lies Burgau Castle. The water castle ways inhabited by the Counts of Heinsberg at the beginning of the 14th Century. After it was destroyed in 1944, the restoration process lasted from 1979 to 1998.
In Theodor Heuss Park is the Bismarck Memorial, erected in 1892 to commemorate the most famous honorary citizen from Düren.
The town hall was inaugurated  in 1959. It now ranks as an example of 1950s architecture under Cultural heritage management.

Politics
The current mayor of Düren is Frank Peter Ullrich of the Social Democratic Party (SPD) since 2020. The most recent mayoral election was held on 13 September 2020, with a runoff held on 27 September, and the results were as follows:

! rowspan=2 colspan=2| Candidate
! rowspan=2| Party
! colspan=2| First round
! colspan=2| Second round
|-
! Votes
! %
! Votes
! %
|-
| bgcolor=| 
| align=left| Frank Peter Ullrich
| align=left| Social Democratic Party
| 10,641
| 36.1
| 14,853
| 69.8
|-
| bgcolor=| 
| align=left| Thomas Floßdorf
| align=left| Christian Democratic Union
| 7,877
| 26.7
| 6,435
| 30.2
|-
| bgcolor=| 
| align=left| Maria Belka
| align=left| Alliance 90/The Greens
| 6,724
| 22.8
|-
| bgcolor=| 
| align=left| Siegfried Fahl
| align=left| Independent
| 2,166
| 7.3
|-
| bgcolor=| 
| align=left| Karl Cremer
| align=left| Free Democratic Party
| 2,113
| 7.2
|-
! colspan=3| Valid votes
! 29,521
! 97.2
! 21,288
! 98.3
|-
! colspan=3| Invalid votes
! 837
! 2.8
! 364
! 1.7
|-
! colspan=3| Total
! 30,358
! 100.0
! 21,652
! 100.0
|-
! colspan=3| Electorate/voter turnout
! 69,324
! 43.8
! 69,257
! 31.3
|-
| colspan=7| Source: City of Düren (1st round, 2nd round)
|}

City council

The Düren city council governs the city alongside the Mayor. The most recent city council election was held on 13 September 2020, and the results were as follows:

! colspan=2| Party
! Votes
! %
! +/-
! Seats
! +/-
|-
| bgcolor=| 
| align=left| Christian Democratic Union (CDU)
| 9,896
| 33.3
|  7.7
| 17
|  3
|-
| bgcolor=| 
| align=left| Social Democratic Party (SPD)
| 8,555
| 28.8
|  3.7
| 15
|  1
|-
| bgcolor=| 
| align=left| Alliance 90/The Greens (Grüne)
| 5,317
| 17.9
|  8.1
| 9
|  4
|-
| bgcolor=| 
| align=left| Alternative for Germany (AfD)
| 2,111
| 7.1
|  1.6
| 4
|  1
|-
| bgcolor=| 
| align=left| Free Democratic Party (FDP)
| 1,338
| 4.5
|  1.2
| 2
| ±0
|-
| 
| align=left| Citizens for Düren (BfD)
| 943
| 3.2
|  1.1
| 2
|  1
|-
| bgcolor=| 
| align=left| The Left (Die Linke)
| 844
| 2.8
|  2.5
| 1
|  2
|-
| bgcolor=| 
| align=left| Pirate Party Germany (Piraten)
| 396
| 1.3
| New
| 1
| New
|-
| bgcolor=| 
| align=left| Independent Harf
| 329
| 1.1
| New
| 1
| New
|-
! colspan=2| Valid votes
! 29,729
! 98.1
! 
! 
! 
|-
! colspan=2| Invalid votes
! 581
! 1.9
! 
! 
! 
|-
! colspan=2| Total
! 30,310
! 100.0
! 
! 52
!  2
|-
! colspan=2| Electorate/voter turnout
! 69,324
! 43.7
!  1.7
! 
! 
|-
| colspan=7| Source: City of Düren
|}

Worship
The most important church in the city is the Annakirche. The church was completely destroyed by bombing in 1944 and rebuilt in the 1950s under the guidance of the architect Rudolf Schwarz. Throughout the city there are 15 other Catholic parish and church communities, including in Arnoldsweiler.
 The most important Protestant church in Düren is the Christuskirche. At its inauguration in 1954, it possessed the highest freestanding bell tower in Germany.
 Up to the destruction of  Kristallnacht, the synagogue was located in  Schützenstraße. In its place is now a stele from Düren artist Rückriem.

Main sights
Burgau Castle (German: Schloss Burgau)
Dicker Turm ("Fat Tower"), a remain of the old city's fortifications
Annakirche (St. Anne Church)
Marienkirche (St. Mary Magdalene Church)
Monument to Bismarck
Leopold Hoesch Museum

Emblem
The emblem of the city of Düren is divided. It shows on the top a red castle, below that, a black eagle and in the lower half a black lion with a red tongue. The black eagle refers to the old history of Düren as a royal city and Reichsstadt. In 1242–46 Düren was bonded to the dukes of Jülich (later, Napoleon was also Duke of Jülich). Their emblem was a lion passant, with open mouth and a red tongue.

Twin towns – sister cities

Düren is twinned with:

 Altmünster, Austria
 Cormeilles, France
 Gradačac, Bosnia and Herzegovina
 Jinhua, China
 Karadeniz Ereğli, Turkey
 Stryi, Ukraine
 Valenciennes, France

Media
Düren has its own radio station (Radio Rur). The station broadcasts on 92.7 and 107.5 MHz, and on cable at 87.5 MHz. There are two daily newspapers (Dürener Zeitung, Dürener Nachrichten) and several weekly papers.

Notable people
 Karl Benrath (1845–1924), church historian
 Johann Bollig (born 1821), Pontifical Theologian and advisor to Pope Pius IX
 Marita Breuer (born 1953), actress
 Manfred Donike (1933–1995), cyclist
 Gert Engels (born 1957), football coach
 John Engels (born 1959), historian
 Simon Ernst (born 1994), Handball Player
 Margot Eskens (born 1939), Schlager singer
 Jerome Felton (born 1987), American football player
 Gossen, Hermann Heinrich (1810–1858), Prussian economist
 Georg Hamel (1877–1954), mathematician
 Wilfried Hannes (born 1957), football player
 Ute Hasse (born 1963), swimmer, Olympic silver medal
 Rudolf Henke (born 1954), MP''
 Leopold Hoesch (1820–1899), founder of Hoesch AG in Dortmund, founder of the Leopold Hoesch Museum in Düren
 Friedrich Honigmann (1841–1913), mining entrepreneur
 Gerd Hoppe (born 1968), Evangelist
 Karin Jacobsen (1924–1989), actress and screenwriter
 Harald Konopka (born 1952), football legends
 Karl Lauterbach (born 1963), economist and politician
 Peter Gustav Lejeune Dirichlet (1805–1859), mathematician
 Michael Lentz (born 1964), writer, musician
 Christoph Moritz (born 1990), football player
 Kalle Pohl (born 1951), comedian
 Eugen Prym (1843–1913), orientalist and linguist
 Friedrich Prym (1841–1915), mathematician), musician
 Sven Schaffrath (born 1984), football player
 Karl-Heinz Schnellinger (born 1939), football player
 Max von Schillings (1868–1933), conductor and composer
 Sybille Schmitz (1909–1955), German film star
 Rudolf Schock (1915–1986), opera singer
 Harald Schumacher (born 1954) football player with 1. FC Köln and Germany
 Hermann Schwarz (1864–1951), philosopher
 Georg Stollenwerk (born 1927), football player
 Klaus H. Carl (born 1935), photographer
 Lars Vogt (1970–2022), pianist
 Paul J. J. Welfens (1957–2022), economist

References

External links

  Düren, official website 

Towns in North Rhine-Westphalia
Free imperial cities
Districts of the Rhine Province
Düren (district)
Articles containing video clips